The 1990–91 Iraq FA Cup was the 14th edition of the Iraq FA Cup as a clubs-only competition. The tournament was won by Al-Zawraa for the third consecutive time and seventh time in total, beating Al-Jaish 4–3 on penalties in the final after a 1–1 draw.

Bracket

Matches

Final

References

External links
 Iraqi Football Website

Iraq FA Cup
Cup